Comyn's Road is an ancient roadway in Scotland, linking Blair Atholl in Perth and Kinross and Ruthven, Badenoch, in the Highlands.

The road dates to the mediaeval period, and was in use until the 17th century, when a shorter route, the Minigaig, was favoured.

References 

13th-century establishments in Scotland
Roads in Scotland
Medieval Scotland